Chryseofusus is a genus of sea snails, marine gastropod mollusks in the subfamily Fusininae of the family Fasciolariidae, the spindle snails, the tulip snails and their allies.

Originally  a subgenus of Fusinus, Chryseofusus was raised to the rank of genus by Callomon & Snyder, 2009

Species
Species within the genus Chryseofusus include:
 Chryseofusus acherusius (Hadorn & Fraussen, 2003)
 Chryseofusus alisae (Hadorn & Fraussen, 2003)
 Chryseofusus alisonae (Hadorn, Snyder & Fraussen, 2008)
 Chryseofusus artutus (Fraussen & Hadorn, 2003)
 Chryseofusus bonaespei (Barnard, 1959)
 Chryseofusus bradneri (Drivas & Jay, 1990)
 Chryseofusus cadus (Hadorn & Fraussen, 2003)
 Chryseofusus chrysodomoides (Schepman, 1911)
 Chryseofusus dapsilis (Hadorn & Fraussen, 2003)
 Chryseofusus graciliformis (G.B. Sowerby II, 1880)
 Chryseofusus hyphalus (M. Smith, 1940)
 Chryseofusus jurgeni (Hadorn & Fraussen, 2002)
 Chryseofusus kazdailisi (Fraussen & Hadorn, 2000)
 Chryseofusus lecourtorum Fraussen & Stahlschmidt, 2014 
 Chryseofusus lorenzi Fraussen & Stahlschmidt, 2014
 Chryseofusus riscus (Hadorn & Fraussen, 2003)
 Chryseofusus satsumaensis (Hadorn & Chino, 2005)
 Chryseofusus scissus (Fraussen & Hadorn, 2003)
 Chryseofusus subangulatus (Martens, 1901)
 Chryseofusus wareni (Hadorn & Fraussen, 2003)
 Chryseofusus westralis (Hadorn & Fraussen, 2003)

References
 Hadorn R. & Fraussen K. (2003). The deep-water Indo-Pacific radiation of Fusinus (Chryseofusus subgen. nov.) (Gastropoda: Fasciolariidae). Iberus 21(1):207-240
 Fraussen K. & Stahlschmidt P. (2014). Two new Chryseofusus Hadorn & Fraussen, 2003 (Gastropoda: Fasciolariidae) from the Nazareth Bank (Mascarene Plateau). Vita Malacologica. 12: 31-35.
page(s): 32, pl. 2 figs 6a-e 

 
Fasciolariidae
Gastropod genera